Bombo Madalena Calandula (born February 23, 1983) is a former team handball player from Angola. She played on the Angola women's national handball team, and participated at the 2011 World Women's Handball Championship in Brazil.

References

External links

1983 births
Living people
Angolan female handball players
Olympic handball players of Angola
Handball players at the 2008 Summer Olympics
African Games gold medalists for Angola
African Games medalists in handball
Competitors at the 2011 All-Africa Games